The Order of Lenin, was an award named after Vladimir Lenin, the leader of the October Revolution. It was established by the Central Executive Committee on April 6, 1930. The order was the highest civilian decoration bestowed by the Soviet Union. The order was awarded to:
 Civilians for outstanding services rendered to the State
 Members of the armed forces for exemplary service
 Those who promoted friendship and cooperation between people and in strengthening peace
 Those with meritorious services to the Soviet state and society

From 1944 to 1957, before the institution of a specific length of service medals, the Order of Lenin was also used to reward 25 years of conspicuous military service. Those who were awarded the titles "Hero of the Soviet Union" and "Hero of Socialist Labour" were also given the order as part of the award. It was also bestowed on cities, companies, factories, regions, military units, and ships. Various educational institutions and military units who received the said Order applied the full name of the order into their official titles.

Design
The first design of the Order of Lenin was sculpted by Pyotr Tayozhny and Ivan Shadr based on sketches by Ivan Dubasov. It was made by Goznak of silver with some lightly gold-plated features. It was a round badge with a central disc featuring Vladimir Lenin's profile surrounded by smokestacks, a tractor and a building, possibly a power plant. A thin red-enamelled border and a circle of wheat panicles surrounded the disc. At the top was a gold-plated "hammer and sickle" emblem, and at the bottom were the Russian initials for "USSR" in red enamel. Only about 800 of this design were minted. It was awarded between 1930–1932.

The second design was awarded from 1934 until 1936. This was a solid gold badge, featuring a silver plated disc bearing Lenin's portrait. The disc is surrounded by two golden panicles of wheat, and a red flag with "LENIN" in Cyrillic script. A red star is placed on the left and the "hammer and sickle" emblem at the bottom, both in red enamel.

The third design was awarded from 1936 until 1943. The design was the same as previous, but the central disc was gray enamelled and Lenin's portrait was a separate piece made of platinum fixed by rivets.

The fourth design was awarded from 1943 until 1991. Design was the same as previous, but was worn as a medal suspended from a ribbon (all previous were screwback).

The badge was originally worn by screwback on the left chest without a ribbon. Later it was worn as a medal suspended from a red ribbon with pairs of yellow stripes at the edges (see image above). The ribbon bar is of the same design.
The portrait of Lenin was originally a riveted silver piece. For a time it was incorporated into a one-piece gold badge, but finally returned as a separate platinum piece until the dissolution of the USSR in 1991.

Recipients
The first Order of Lenin was awarded to the newspaper Komsomolskaya Pravda on 23 May 1930. Also among the first ten recipients were five industrial companies, three pilots, and the Secretary to the Central Executive Committee Avel Enukidze. The first person to be awarded a second Order of Lenin was the pilot Valery Chkalov in 1936. Another pilot, Vladimir Kokkinaki, became the first to receive a third Order in 1939.

The first five foreign recipients – who were presented with the Order on May 17, 1932 – comprised a German and four US citizens, one of whom was Frank Bruno Honey. They received the award for helping in the reconstruction of Soviet industry and agriculture, during 1931–1934.

431,418 orders were awarded in total, with the last on 21 December 1991.

Most frequent
 11 times:
Nikolay Patolichev, longtime Minister for Foreign Trade of the USSR 
 Dmitriy Ustinov, Defence Minister in 1976–1984
 10 times:
 Efim Slavsky, Head of Sredmash, the ministry responsible for nuclear industry, in 1957–1986
 Alexander Sergeyevich Yakovlev, aircraft designer
 9 times:
 , Minister of Aviation Industry 1953–1977
 Vasily Ryabikov, defence industry official, co-head (together with Sergey Korolev) of the first Sputnik project
 Nikolay Semyonov, winner of 1956 Nobel Prize in chemistry
 Anatoly Petrovich Alexandrov; president of the Soviet Academy of Sciences (1975–1986)
 Vasily Chuikov, World War II commander
 Ivan Papanin, polar explorer
 8 times:
 Leonid Brezhnev, General Secretary of the Soviet Union
 Kliment Voroshilov, Marshal of the Soviet Union

Notable collective recipients
 All fifteen republics of the Soviet Union
 Komsomol, the Young Communist League
 LOMO, Leningrad Optical-Mechanical Corporation
 ZIL, automobile manufacturer (for their manufacturing of weapons and ammunition)
 Kryvorizhstal, massively successful and profitable steel mill
 Moscow Region
 Komsomolskaya Pravda newspaper
 Pravda newspaper
 Cities of Moscow, Donetsk, and Yekaterinburg
 62nd Army for extraordinary valor in the defence of Stalingrad
 Saint Petersburg Electrotechnical University "LETI"
 Soviet ship Stary Bolshevik, for the courage in Convoy PQ 16 (World War II).

Notable individual recipients
 Sergey Afanasyev (Soviet "Space Minister", awarded 7 times)
 Aziz Aliyev (Azerbaijani and Dagestani politician and scientist, awarded 2 times)
Sona Akhundova-Bagirbekova (Azerbaijani ophthalmologist)
 Clyde G. Armistead and William Latimer Lavery (American air mechanics awarded for participation in search and rescue operations of the steamship Cheliuskin)
 George Avakian American record producer who promoted international musical exchange between Russian and American musicians.
 Kateryna Boloshkevich, (Ukrainian weaver and statesperson, awarded 2 times)
 Valeriy Borzov (Soviet Ukrainian sprinter)
 Gertrude Boyarski (Polish partisan during WWII)
 Emilian Bukov (Soviet writer for the Moldavian SSR, awarded 2 times)
 Bill Booth (for parachuting into the North Pole)
 Lyudmila Byakova (Russian seamstress)
 Sukarno (President of Indonesia)
 Fidel Castro (President of Cuba)
 Konstantin Chelpan (Chief designer of the T-34 tank engine)
 Luis Corvalán (secretary general of the Communist Party of Chile)
 Álvaro Cunhal  (Portuguese politician and writer; instrumental in the overthrow of the fascist dictatorial regime of Estado Novo)
 Sripat Amrit Dange (Indian Communist leader who had strongly endorsed pro-Soviet views) He was a founding member of the Communist Party of India (CPI). He also worked as Chairman of Communist Party of India (CPI) for 19 years, was awarded the Order of Lenin in 1974.
 Mario Del Monaco (Italian tenor)
 Valentina Dimitrieva (farm worker)
 Chandra Rajeswara Rao (He was one of the leaders of the Telangana Rebellion (1946–1951). He also worked as Communist Party of India (CPI) General Secretary for 28 years,  was awarded the Order of Lenin in 1974.) 
 Joseph Davies (American diplomat who strongly supported Stalin and the Soviet Union)
 Sergei Eisenstein (film director)
 Roza Eldarova (Chairwoman of the Presidium of the Supreme Soviet of the Dagestan ASSR, member of the Presidium of the Supreme Soviet of the RSFSR)
 Zinaida Yermolyeva (biochemist, independently synthesized penicillin for the Soviet military during World War II)
 Muhammed Faris (Syrian research cosmonaut, July 30, 1987)
 Yuri Gagarin (Cosmonaut, first human being in outer space)
 Israel Gelfand (Soviet mathematician, awarded 3 times)
 Mikhail Girshovich (Major-General)
 Kim Pen Hwa (collective farm manager, awarded 4 times)
 Enver Hoxha (Leader of the People's Republic of Albania)
 Pinkhus Turjan (Soviet Captain)
 Otto Grotewohl (former prime minister of GDR)
 Armand Hammer (American businessman and philanthropist)
 Erich Honecker (former leader of GDR)
 Sergey Ilyushin (Soviet pilot and aircraft designer, awarded 8 times)
 Wojciech Jaruzelski (former leader of People's Republic of Poland)
 Mikhail Kalashnikov (designer of the AK-47, AKM, AK-74 and AK-100 assault rifles along with RPK and PK machine guns)#
 Juho Kusti Paasikivi (President of Finland 1946-1956)
 Urho Kekkonen (President of Finland 1956-1982)
 Mauno Koivisto (President of Finland 1982-1994)
 Raïssa Koublitskaïa (Soviet Belarusian agricultural worker and politician, awarded twice)
 Nikita Khrushchev (Chairman of the Council of Peoples Commissars, Soviet Union)
 Klavdiya Kildsheva (1917 - 1994), aviation engineer and Hero of Socialist Labor
 Kim Il-sung (President of North Korea, awarded 2 times)
 Yevheniia Kucherenko (Ukrainian pedagogue of the Ukrainian language and literature)
 Igor Kurchatov (physicist, leader of the Soviet atomic bomb project, awarded 5 times)
 Yanka Kupala (Belarusian poet, for the book «Ад сэрца» [From the heart])
 Vladimir Komarov (Cosmonaut, first cosmonaut to fly in space twice and first man to die on a space mission, awarded twice)
 Vladimir Konovalov (sub-commander and admiral, awarded 3 times)
 Alexei Krylov (Russian naval engineer, applied mathematician and memoirist, awarded 3 times)
 Luigi Longo (Italy; Political commissar of the XII International Brigade in Spain (1936–1938), deputy commander of the Freedom Volunteers Corp (1943–1945) and secretary (1964–1972) and president (1972–1980) of the Italian Communist Party)
 Fariza Magomadova (Chechen boarding school director and pioneer for women's education)
 Nelson Mandela (South African leader)
 Leila Mardanshina (Soviet gas and oil operator)
 Kirill Mazurov (Belarusian Soviet politician)
 Ramón Mercader (Spanish NKVD agent, assassinated Leon Trotsky)
 Boris Mikhailov (Soviet ice hockey team captain in the 1970s and 1980s)
 Shoista Mullodzhanova (Bukharian Jewish Shashmakom singer)
 Alexander Morozov (designer of the T-64 tank)
 Yelena Mukhina (gymnast, 1960–2006)
 Rahmon Nabiyev (First Secretary of the Communist party of Tajikistan, later president of Tajikistan)
 Alexander Nadiradze (Soviet Georgian scientist who developed the first mobile ICBM systems)
 Gamal Abdel Nasser (Egyptian president)
 Vilyam Genrikhovich Fisher (Soviet spy)
 Fyodor Okhlopkov (World War II hero)
 Nikolai Ostrovsky (Soviet author, 1904–1936)
 Lyudmila Pavlichenko (Soviet sniper World War II, two times)
 Mausuza Vanakhun (Soviet military officer, Dungan national hero)
 Yevgeny Pepelyaev (fighter pilot in the Korean War)
 Maya Plisetskaya (Prima Ballerina Bolshoi Ballet Company, one time 1964)
 Kim Philby (British/Soviet double agent)
 Neville Ramsbottom-Isherwood (commander of Operation Benedict, an RAF fighter wing that defended Murmansk in late 1941)
 Konstantin Rokossovsky (World War II Marshal of the Soviet Union, awarded 7 times)
 Arnold Rüütel (Estonian communist leader, later president of the independent Estonia)
 Anatoly Sagalevich (underwater explorer, creator of the MIR DSV)
 Belisario Sanchez Mateos (Spanish painter, sculptor and social activist)
 Aleksandr Sergeyevich Senatorov
 Dmitri Shostakovich (Soviet composer, awarded three times)
 Mikhail Shumayev (nuclear physicist, engineer and chemist)
 Ivan Sidorenko (Soviet sniper in World War II)
 Sergey Spasokukotsky (surgeon and member of the Soviet Academy of Sciences, 1870–1943)
 Nikolay Sutyagin (fighter pilot in World War II and Korean War)
 Max Taitz (scientist in aerodynamics, theory of jet engines and flight testing of aircraft, one of the founders of the Gromov Flight Research Institute, recipient of the Stalin Prize (1949 and 1953), Honoured Scientist of the RSFSR, awarded twice)
 Valentina Tereshkova (Cosmonaut, first woman in space, awarded twice)
 Semyon Timoshenko (World War II general, awarded 5 times)
 Josip Broz Tito (President of Yugoslavia 1945–1980)
 Gherman Titov (Cosmonaut, awarded twice)
 Vladislav Tretiak (Soviet ice hockey goaltender)
 Aleksandr Vasilevsky (Soviet marshal, awarded 8 times)
 Alina Vedmid (Ukrainian politician and agronomist)
 Pyotr Vershigora (Soviet major general and writer, Soviet partisan leader during World War II)
 Pham Tuan (Vietnamese cosmonaut)
 Vladislav Volkov (Cosmonaut)
 Sergei Novokov (Soviet sniper during Battle of Stalingrad, and liberation of Chelmno and Majdanek camps)
 Lev Yashin (Soviet football goalkeeper)
 Vasily Grigoryevich Zaitsev (Soviet sniper during the Battle of Stalingrad, awarded 4 times)
 Yakov Zeldovich (Soviet physicist)
 Georgy Zhukov (Marshal of the Soviet Union)
 Lyudmila Zykina (folk singer)
 Michał Rola-Żymierski (Marshal of Poland)
 Liya Shakirova, Soviet linguist
 Joseph Stalin (1949)
 Anatoly Karpov (World Chess Champion)
 Sergei Krikalev (Cosmonaut, person with most time in space)
 Vasili Mikhailovich Blokhin (Soviet executioner; most prolific official executioner in recorded world history)
 Vladimir Pravik (firefighter who died in the Chernobyl disaster)
 Semyon Nomokonov (Soviet sniper of Buryat descent) 
 Dora Lazurkina (Old Bolshevik, Soviet Politician)
 Vladimir Tokarenko (liquidator  of Chernobyl disaster)
 Clara Zetkin (member of the Communist Part of Germany and women's rights activist.)
 Anatoly Solovyev (Soviet cosmonaut and pilot)
 Leonid Telyatnikov (Chief of the Chernobyl Nuclear Power Plant Fire Brigade, first responder to the Chernobyl disaster. Died of cancer in 2004)
 Viktor Kibenok (Chief of the Pripyat Fire Department, first responder to the Chernobyl explosion. Died of radiation sickness on May 11th 1986)
 Faina Kotkowa (Soviet weaver)

Fictional recipients
 In the James Bond film A View to a Kill, Bond is awarded the Order of Lenin, and is described as the first foreign recipient; the first real foreign recipient was Luigi Longo.
 In IPC Publication's Battle Picture Weekly, a character, "Johnny Red", is awarded the Order of Lenin for saving the life of a political commissar from a German air ace.
 In the 1990 film adaption of Tom Clancy's first novel, The Hunt for Red October, following an order to surrender by a US Navy ship, Captain Ramius (Sean Connery) of Red October tells Dr. Petrov, the Chief Medical Officer  (Tim Curry), "you will go with the crew; the officers and I will submerge beneath you and scuttle the ship." Dr. Petrov responds "You will receive the Order of Lenin for this, Captain."
 In the movie Indiana Jones and the Kingdom of the Crystal Skull, Jones's adversary Col. Irina Spalko was awarded the Order of Lenin three times.
 In the video game Singularity, Viktor Barisov is awarded the Order of Lenin for his work on the fictional element E99.
 In Ian Fleming's novel From Russia With Love, Colonel Rosa Klebb was awarded the order once and Colonel General Grubozaboyschihov was awarded it twice.
 In the 2004 video game Metal Gear Solid 3: Snake Eater, weapons designer Alexander Leonovitch Granin received the Order of Lenin for his inventions.
 In the Person of Interest season 3 episode Razgovor, Genrika Zherova, a Russian immigrant in New York, keeps an Order of Lenin earned by her grandfather for his services in the KGB.
 In a satirical political advertisement by The Lincoln Project, Fox News host Tucker Carlson was awarded the Order of Lenin for supporting Russia in its 2022 invasion of Ukraine.

See also

 Awards and decorations of the Soviet Union
 Awards and decorations of the Russian Federation
 Order of Georgi Dimitrov
 Order of Karl Marx
 Order of Kim Il-sung
 Order of Sukhbaatar

References

External links
 Legal Library of the USSR 

 
Lenin, Order of
Military awards and decorations of the Soviet Union
Awards established in 1930
Awards disestablished in 1991
1930 establishments in the Soviet Union
1991 disestablishments in the Soviet Union
Long service medals